Jonathan Filipe (born January 10, 1999) is an American soccer player who plays for USL Championship club Hartford Athletic.

Career

Early career
Filipe played high school soccer at Danbury High School, also going on to play club soccer with Beachside SC and the New York Red Bulls academy, where he tallied 10 goals in 24 appearances for the Red Bulls during the 2017–18 season.

In 2018, Filipe attended Fairfield University to play college soccer, going on to make 59 appearances for the Stags, scoring 19 goals and tallying nine assists. He was named a MAAC All-Rookie team in his freshman season.

Filipe also played with USL League Two side New York Red Bulls U23, making 16 appearances and scoring seven goals between 2019 and 2021, with the 2020 season cancelled due to the COVID-19 pandemic.

Professional
On March 8, 2022, Filipe signed with USL Championship club New York Red Bulls II. He made his professional debut on March 12, 2022, starting against The Miami FC. On August 31, 2022, Felipe scored two goals for New York Red Bulls II in a 3-3 draw versus Hartford Athletic.

References

External links 
 

1999 births
Living people
American soccer players
Association football forwards
Danbury High School alumni
Fairfield Stags men's soccer players
Hartford Athletic players
New York Red Bulls II players
New York Red Bulls U-23 players
People from Danbury, Connecticut
Soccer players from Connecticut
USL Championship players
USL League Two players